First Assembly of God may refer to:

 Dream City Church (previously Phoenix First Assembly of God), an Assemblies of God megachurch in Phoenix, Arizona
 Van Buren First Assembly of God, an Assemblies of God church in Arkansas